Aap or AAP may refer to:

Places
 Alexandra Palace railway station in London, UK
 Ann Arbor Pioneer High School, a high school in Michigan, United States
 Cornell University College of Architecture, Art, and Planning, New York, United States

Aerodromes
 Aji Pangeran Tumenggung Pranoto International Airport IATA code
 Aappilattoq Heliport (Avannaata) in Aappilattoq, Greenland
 Andrau Airpark, a former airport in Houston, Texas, United States

Aviation and aerospace
 Agrupación Aérea Presidencial, the Argentine president's personal air fleet
 Apollo Applications Program, NASA's vision for long-range space exploration based on technologies developed for Project Apollo
 Aircraft Acceptance Point, a term used by the Royal Flying Corps to designate Lympne Aerodrome (later RAF Lympne)

Business
 Accredited ACH Professional, an Electronic Payments Professional
 Advance Auto Parts, an American vehicle parts retailer
 Associated Artists Productions, a film distributor
 Association of American Publishers, a United States trade association

Language, linguistics, vocabulary
 Ap (water), a Sanskrit word
 Pará Arára language, a Cariban language of Brazil

Media
 ArtAsiaPacific, a contemporary art and culture magazine
 Australian Associated Press, Australia's national news agency

Medicine and dentistry
 Alanine aminopeptidase, a medical biomarker enzyme
 Atypical antipsychotic, a group of antipsychotic drugs
 American Academy of Pediatrics, an American and Canadian professional medical fellowship
 American Academy of Periodontology, a professional organization for periodontists
 Association of Academic Physiatrists, an organization to support the advancement of physical medicine and rehabilitation
 Association of American Physicians, a medical honor society

Politics
 Aam Aadmi Party, a political party in India

Miscellaneous organizations
 Airport Armed Police in Bangladesh
 Association of Australasian Palaeontologists
 Australasian Association of Philosophy
 Automobile Association Philippines, a member of the Fédération Internationale de l'Automobile

Technology
 A-A-P, a computer software build and installation utility
 Advanced Active Partition, a special type of active partition in a MBR

Other uses
 Argumentum ad populum, a logical fallacy
 Aerobic anoxygenic phototroph, a metabolic classification of bacteria

See also

 
 AAPS (disambiguation)
 2AP (disambiguation)
 AP (disambiguation)
 APP (disambiguation)
 APA (disambiguation)
 PAA (disambiguation)